StompTown Revival, also known as STR, are an American Christian music duo from Nashville, Tennessee, and they started making music together in 2012. The first extended play, StompTown Revival, was released in 2012 by Save the City Music. This EP charted on two Billboard magazine charts.

Background
The duo are music producer Brandon Bee a Seattle-native, and the frontman from Circleslide and a San Antonio-native, Gabe Martinez. Bee performs vocals, guitar, the slide guitar, stompbox, keys, and bass guitar, while Martinez plays the vocals, guitar, and harmonica.

Music history
They released their first musical project, an extended play, StompTown Revival, on October 2, 2012, with Save the City Records. This EP charted on two Billboard magazine charts, while it placed on the Christian Albums and Heatseekers Albums charts, where it peaked at Nos. 48 and 47, correspondingly. The duo played at the 2013 Rock of Ages Festival.

Members
 Brandon Bee – vocals, guitar, slide Guitar, stompbox, keys, bass
 Gabe Martinez – vocals, guitar, harmonica

Discography

References

External links

American musical duos
Musical groups established in 2012
Musical groups from Nashville, Tennessee
2012 establishments in Tennessee